Batesville is a city in Panola County, Mississippi, United States. The population was 7,463 at the 2010 census.

Batesville is one of two county seats which the legislature established for Panola County, related to a longstanding rivalry between towns on either side of the Tallahatchie River; the other is Sardis, located north of the river.

History
Batesville was founded in the 1850s following the construction of the Mississippi and Tennessee Railroad.

Geography

Demographics

2020 census

As of the 2020 United States Census, there were 7,523 people, 2,429 households, and 1,669 families residing in the city.

2000 census
As of the census of 2000, there were 7,113 people, 2,577 households, and 1,821 families residing in the city. The population density was 638.2 people per square mile (246.3/km2). There were 2,791 housing units at an average density of 250.4 per square mile (96.6/km2). The racial makeup of the city was 56.43% White, 41.88% African American, 0.06% Native American, 0.38% Asian, 0.04% Pacific Islander, 0.82% from other races, and 0.39% from two or more races. Hispanic or Latino of any race were 1.60% of the population.

There were 2,577 households, out of which 35.7% had children under the age of 18 living with them, 44.7% were married couples living together, 21.5% had a female householder with no husband present, and 29.3% were non-families. 26.2% of all households were made up of individuals, and 12.6% had someone living alone who was 65 years of age or older. The average household size was 2.59 and the average family size was 3.14.

In the city, the population was spread out, with 28.9% under the age of 18, 11.6% from 18 to 24, 26.4% from 25 to 44, 18.6% from 45 to 64, and 14.4% who were 65 years of age or older. The median age was 33 years. For every 100 females, there were 85.9 males. For every 100 females age 18 and over, there were 78.4 males. The median income for a household in the city was $29,875, and the median income for a family was $38,849. Males had a median income of $30,998 versus $22,029 for females. The per capita income for the city was $15,814. About 21.9% of families and 28.7% of the population were below the poverty line, including 36.1% of those under age 18 and 27.0% of those age 65 or over.

Education
South Panola School District (SPSD) operates schools in Batesville and has its headquarters in Batesville. Batesville Elementary School, Batesville Intermediate School, Batesville Middle School, Batesville Junior High School, and South Panola High School serve Batesville.

A private academy founded in 1987, North Delta School, also serves Panola County and the surrounding area.

Infrastructure

Transportation

Rail service is provided by Grenada Railway (formerly Illinois Central Railroad).

Amtrak's City of New Orleans used to provide passenger service, but the train was rerouted to the Delta region in 1995.

The short-lived Batesville Southwestern Railroad was established in Batesville.

Notable people
 Al Baker – former Major League Baseball player.
 Cliff Finch – governor of Mississippi from 1976 to 1980
 Joe C. Gardner – Mississippi state legislator
 Jermarcus Hardrick - current CFL player for the Winnipeg Blue Bombers
 John Jerry - NFL offensive lineman
 Peria Jerry – University of Mississippi and Atlanta Falcons defensive tackle
 Ronnie Musgrove – governor of Mississippi from 2000 to 2004, was born in Tocowa in 1956 and reared in Batesville.
 Jameson Rodgers - Country music singer-songwriter
 Dwayne Rudd – former NFL player for the Minnesota Vikings, Tampa Bay Buccaneers, Oakland Raiders, and Cleveland Browns.
 Deshea Townsend – Pittsburgh Steelers defensive back
 Sammy Vick – former Major League Baseball player
 Soulja Boy - rapper

References

External links

 Panola Partnership website

Cities in Mississippi
Cities in Panola County, Mississippi
County seats in Mississippi